The Diocese of Puntarenas is a Latin Church ecclesiastical territory or diocese of the Catholic Church in Costa Rica. It is a suffragan diocese in the ecclesiastical province of the metropolitan Archdiocese of San José de Costa Rica. It was erected as a diocese 17 April 1998.

Ordinaries
Hugo Barrantes Ureña (1998–2002), appointed Archbishop of San José de Costa Rica
Oscar Gerardo Fernández Guillén (2003– )

External links and references
Diócesis de Puntarenas Costa Rica  official site (in Spanish)

Puntarenas
Puntarenas
Puntarenas